Rejoice, is a song written Wayne Héctor and by Steve McCutcheon alias Steve Mac, in 2005, original for the group of crossover classical Il Divo.

The song, was written like a Christmas songs, that includes  in disk The Christmas Collection of Il Divo, published on October 25, 2005.

Symbolism of the song
The song refers to the faith that the human being and the way you lose "Where did I misplace my faith?". That when you're about to throw it all away, we must reflect and find a new path. Under the slogan that what is lost, it becomes to find "What was lost, is found".

Versions 
 Il Divo, original version, in 2005, from album The Christmas Collection.
 Katherine Jenkins made a version of the song in 2009, from album Rejoice.

References 

British Christmas songs
Christmas carols
Songs written by Steve Mac
Songs written by Wayne Hector
2005 songs